Carlos Eduardo Passos Farias (born February 10, 1982), known as Dudu, is a Brazilian footballer who plays for Mogi Mirim as midfielder.

Career statistics

References

External links

1982 births
Living people
Brazilian footballers
Association football midfielders
Campeonato Brasileiro Série A players
Campeonato Brasileiro Série B players
Campeonato Brasileiro Série C players
Campeonato Brasileiro Série D players
Moto Club de São Luís players
América Futebol Clube (MG) players
Associação Desportiva São Caetano players
Botafogo Futebol Clube (SP) players
Mogi Mirim Esporte Clube players